Simone Eder (born 21 April 1974) is an Austrian luger. She competed in the women's singles event at the 2002 Winter Olympics.

References

External links
 

1974 births
Living people
Austrian female lugers
Olympic lugers of Austria
Lugers at the 2002 Winter Olympics
Sportspeople from Innsbruck